Shalwan Pora is a village in Anantnag tehsil in Anantnag district in Jammu and Kashmir, India.

Demographics
The location code or village code of Shalwan Pora village is 003711. Shalwan Pora village is located in Anantnag Tehsil of Anantnag district in Jammu & Kashmir, India.

According to the 2011 Census of India, there are 202 individual homes in the village with a total population of 1,502.

Transport

By Rail
Sadura Railway Station and Anantnag Railway Station are the very near by railway stations to Shalwan Pora. However Jammu Tawi railway station is major railway station   near to Shalwan Pora.

References

Villages in Anantnag district